Rhaphidospora is a genus of flowering plants belonging to the family Acanthaceae. A classification of the Acanthaceae published in 2022 treats Rhaphidospora as a  synonym of Justicia.

Its native range is Tropical and Southern Africa, Madagascar, Tropical Asia to Eastern Australia.

Species:
Rhaphidospora bonneyana 
Rhaphidospora cavernarum 
Rhaphidospora javanica 
Rhaphidospora luzonensis 
Rhaphidospora medullosa 
Rhaphidospora membranifolia 
Rhaphidospora novoguineensis 
Rhaphidospora platyphylla

References

Acanthaceae
Acanthaceae genera